The Murtuza Mukhtarov mosque is a mosque in Baku, Azerbaijan.

History 
Construction of the mosque was initiated in 1901 by local residents. Due to material deficit, construction was suspended. The residents asked Murtuza Mukhtarov for financial aid.

Mukhtarov hired several architects (including the main architect Ziver-bey Akhmedbekov) and took over the construction costs.

Construction lasted for 8 years and was completed in 1908.

The mosque was used as a weaving workshop in the Soviet Union. Between 1985 and 1989, it was used as a hall for an exhibition of works of Sattar Bahlulzade. Since 1989, the building has functioned as a mosque.

Mukhtarov gave a Quran with golden Arabic calligraphy to the mosque as a special gift. It weighs 25 kilograms.

The mosque has two minarets that are 47 meters tall. Each has 140 steps. The mosque also has a prayer room for women. Murtuza Mukhtarov's grave is located in the courtyard of the mosque. There is an inscription reading: "Greeting to the prophets" on the right and left sides of the mosque which was engraved with Arabic letters.

See also
 Islam in Azerbaijan
 List of mosques in Azerbaijan

References 

1908 establishments in Asia
Mosques in Baku
Zivar bey Ahmadbeyov buildings and structures